Dawning of a New Age is the second demo by the Northern Irish Celtic metal band Waylander, released on cassette in 1996.

Track listing

Band line-up
Den Ferran - drums
Ciaran O'Hagan - vocals
Dermot O'Hagan - guitars
Michael Proctor - bass
Clive Culbertson - keyboards

Waylander (band) albums
1996 albums
Demo albums